Khard Mard-e Anisi (also Romanized as Khard Mard-e Anīsī) is a village in Pazevar Rural District, Rudbast District, Babolsar County, Mazandaran Province, Iran. At the 2006 census, its population was 446, in 101 families.

References 

Populated places in Babolsar County